Carlito Junior Milfort (born March 15, 1999), known professionally as Poorstacy (stylized in all caps) is an American musician from Palm Beach, Florida. His music merges influences from hip hop, punk rock and heavy metal. He has released two studio albums, two EPs, and was featured on the Grammy Award nominated Bill & Ted Face the Music soundtrack.

Biography
Carlito Junior Milfort  was born in Palm Beach, Florida. His father taught him multiple instruments as a child. He was inspired to listen to rock music and play guitar through playing Guitar Hero. Early in life, he was inspired by his local metalcore as well as the underground Miami hip hop scene. He soon began performing live with his band in the local heavy metal, punk rock and gothic rock scenes. He soon after began uploading music online, particularly on SoundCloud. Originally performing  under a number a pseudonyms, including Lito Xantana, Vizion and Scarybrats, he eventually took on the stage name "Poorstacy" in reference to skater Stacy Peralta. His explanation for the name was that "Stacy Peralta himself was not shown a lot of attention at the start, but he ended up being one of the biggest legends in skateboarding in the end. I always loved the idea of that, of doing your own thing and having it pay off".

Milfort's song "Make Up", uploading to Soundcloud in March 2019 received 35,000 views in one day. On September 13 of the same year, his debut EP I Don't Care was released through Internet Money records, produced by Nick Mira. Milfort was featured on the song "Urself" from Iann Dior's debut album Industry Plant, released November 8.

On January 31, 2020, he released the song "I Can't Sleep" featuring Iann Dior as a single. His debut album, the Breakfast Club was originally planned to be released on February 7, through 10K Projects. The album's track "Darkness" was released as a single on March 6, and the album was then released on March 13, 2020. On June 12, he was featured on the song "Headspace" by the band Fame on Fire. On June 21, he released the single "Choose Life", featuring Travis Barker. With a title taken from a monologue from the film Trainspotting, the song was a departure from emo rap into a punk rock. On July 26, a deluxe version of the Breakfast Club was released featuring three bonus tracks: "Choose Life", "Don't Go Outside" and "Don't Look At Me" featuring Whethan. Milfort's song "Darkest Night" was featured on the soundtrack for Bill & Ted Face the Music released on August 28, 2020. The soundtrack was eventually nominated for a Grammy Award. On September 20, he independently released a mini EP through SoundCloud, titled I Don't Rap, his first release to entirely consist of rapping and no singing. On November 13, he released the single "Nothing Left" then on December 11, he released the single "Hills Have Eyes", both featuring Travis Barker. On May 21, 2021, he released the single "Public Enemy" which was accompanied by a music video. On 9 July, he released the post-hardcore song "Children of the Dark", along with a music video, and announced that his second studio album Party at the Cemetery was set to be released in autumn 2021. On August 13, he released the single "Party at the Cemetery".

Musical style and influence
His music has been described as emo rap, dance punk, post-punk punk rap and punk rock, often incorporating elements of post-hardcore, grunge, alternative rock, pop punk and gothic rock. Musician Oliver Tree stated in an article for Billboard that Milfort "is making his own new wave of emo alternative". A March 2021 article by Alternative Press, writer Alex Darus described his music as "taking edgy SoundCloud rap and giving it a gritty pop-punk spin" and as "combin[ing] rap and pop punk but also steady emo, dreamy indie and catchy pop to make a sound all his own". Another article by the magazine described how "Making his appearance during the rise of SoundCloud rap, Milfort sets himself apart from other trap artists with his non-conformist approach to genre and the result is a fusion of different vibes created with stark enginuity". Revolver magazine writer Eli Enis described his sound as "Eschewing booming 808s for a rubbery electro-punk groove".

He has cited musical influences including the Sisters of Mercy, Billy Idol, XXXTentacion. the Kooks, the Strokes, My Chemical Romance, Pierce the Veil, AFI, Slipknot, Earl Sweatshirt and Flatbush Zombies, and lyrical narrative influences including V for Vendetta, Trainspotting and Halloween.

He has been cited by Yungblud as an influence on his 2020 album Weird!.

Discography

Studio albums

Extended plays

Singles

As lead artist

As featured artist

References

1999 births
Living people
21st-century American male singers
21st-century American singers
American alternative rock musicians
American hip hop musicians
American male pop singers
American male rappers
American punk rock singers
Emo rap musicians
People from Palm Beach, Florida